Mathania may refer to:
 Mathania, Jodhpur, a village in Rajasthan, India
 Mathania (butterfly), a genus of butterflies